John Mariano (born August 5, 1960) is an American actor who has worked in film, television, animation and nightclubs. He is known for playing tough guys with a comic edge. His ability of physical comedy has been compared to Jerry Lewis and Buster Keaton. Keaton's wife Eleanor was quoted as saying; "He reminded me so much of Buster, it gave me chills". He got his start in films playing a prissy bank teller in Tough Guys with Burt Lancaster and Kirk Douglas. Working steadily in both film and television, he's best remembered on television for playing Johnny the waiter in Caroline in the City with Lea Thompson. A gifted improviser, sketch player and voice-over artist, his impression of Robert De Niro in a sketch entitled "De Niro Sings the Supremes" at The Groundlings, led to him playing a pigeon named Bobby in Animaniacs, who is based on a character played by De Niro in Goodfellas.

Filmography

Animation

Live-action

Film

Video games

External links
 John Mariano at The Internet Movie Database

Living people
Male actors from New York City
American male film actors
American male voice actors
American male television actors
American people of Italian descent
American male video game actors
People from Queens, New York
1960 births